The Samsung Galaxy Grand Max is an Android smartphone manufactured by Samsung Electronics and was released in 2015.

Features 
 Rear Camera: 13 MP
 Front Camera: 5 MP 
 Memory: 1.5 GB RAM
 Storage: 16 GB 
 Battery: Li-Ion 2500 mAh
 Size: 5.25 In
 Operating System: Android 4.4.4 KitKat (original); Android 5.1.1 Lollipop (current; upgradable)
 Weight: 161 g
 IPS LCD capacitive touchscreen
 CPU:  Quad-core 1.2 GHz Cortex-A53
 Chipset:  Qualcomm MSM8916 Snapdragon 410
 GPU:  Adreno 306
 WLAN:  Wi-Fi 802.11 a/b/g/n, dual-band, Wi-Fi Direct, hotspot
 Bluetooth:  v4.0, A2DP, EDR, LE
 USB:  microUSB v2.0
 Sensors:  Accelerometer, proximity, gyroscope.
 Other : South Korea Model supports T-DMB & Smart DMB

References

 http://gadgets.ndtv.com/samsung-galaxy-grand-max-2284

Samsung Galaxy
Android (operating system) devices
Mobile phones introduced in 2015
Samsung smartphones
Discontinued smartphones